Salvador Aulestia (November 13, 1915 – June 1994), was a Spanish painter, sculptor, drawer and writer born in Barcelona (Spain).
Author of the Sideroploide, a 65 meter long and 17 meter high sculpture at the Barcelona harbor, he earned international acclaim with exhibitions in Rome (Italy) and in the United States in the fifties and sixties until Palazzo Reale in Milan (Italy)
Special personal citation and pavilion at the XXXIV Venice Biennial. His artistic path goes from classical expressionism to pure abstraction through figurative and surrealist abstraction, fauvism, postcubism, expressionism, before founding, in 1963, his own personal “ism”, publishing the Apotelesmatical Art Manifesto.

Biography 
Born into the families of a soldier officer, Salvador Aulestia grew up in until three years old in calle Naples y Consejo de Ciento of Barcelona, Spain. Then his family went to live in the Camp d'en Grassot (which was then the outskirts of Barcelona, now Career d'en Grassot). Already at age six the drawings are distinguished by significant clarity and synthesis for his age. At eight he began the lecture of an important private library about esotericism and magic. Later he went to live in calle Roger de Flor (Gracia). After changing several schools he was inscribed at the "Las Reales Escuelas Pias". In 1931 he entered the seminary but never leaves the artistic inspiration. In 1935, invited to a dinner, Salvador Aulestia met Garcia Lorca, of which draws a sketch that will be used later for a portrait. On July 19, 1936, began the Spanish Civil War and the seminary was closed. After being involved in various vicissitudes, participate in some battles (as tenant for the PSOE) and then prisoned, he came back to Barcelona in 1940 . He inscribed at the Escuela de Artes Y Oficios de Barcelona. He continues his artistic career with a series of exhibitions that will take him around the world. After some initial contacts in the fifties, he moved permanently to Milan (Italy) in 1972, where he produced paintings, drawings, sculptures in addition to publishing numerous books until his death in 1994. "...His work show a theurgical feeling with plastic expressionism and abstract tendency..."(Gran Enciclopedia Catalana

Publications 
Salvador Aulestia is author of several books:
 "El Embarcadero de las emociones" - 1948
 "Tauromaquia" - 1953
 "La mano lenguaje desconocido" - 1954
 "El enigma de su personalidad" - 1955
 "Discurso poemita sobre la fiesta de los toros" - 1957
 "La fiesta de los toros" - 1967
 "Il teraphim" - 1975
 "La magia del calcio" - 1982. Premio Chiavari Prize for best sport book in 1982 (Prologue by Juan Antonio Samaranch - former IOC president)
 "La boxe, rito di affrontamento con i pugni sul ring" - 1984

References 

Spanish sculptors
Spanish male sculptors
1915 births
1994 deaths